Leon Harvey was an American football, basketball and ice hockey coach. He served as the head football coach (1923–1928), head basketball coach (1922–1929), and head ice hockey coach (1924–1926) at Michigan Technological University–then known as the Michigan College of Mines.

Head coaching record

References

Year of birth missing
Year of death missing
Michigan Tech Huskies football coaches
Michigan Tech Huskies men's basketball coaches
Michigan Tech Huskies men's ice hockey coaches